Gamma Eridani (γ Eridani, abbreviated Gamma Eri, γ Eri), formally named Zaurak , is a variable star in the constellation of Eridanus. It is visible to the naked eye with an apparent visual magnitude that varies around 2.9, and lies at a distance of about 203 light years from the Sun, as determined by the Hipparcos astrometry satellite.

Description

Gamma Eridani has been defined as a standard star for the spectral class M0III-IIIb.  It is a red giant on the asymptotic giant branch, fusing hydrogen and helium in separate shells outside its core.  Observations published in 1960 showed it to vary in brightness by a few hundredths of a magnitude.  In 1977, it was officially listed as a variable star in the General Catalogue of Variable Stars although the class of variable is uncertain.

Nomenclature 
Gamma Eridani is the star's Bayer designation. It has the traditional name Zaurak, alternatively spelled Zaurac, which is Arabic for 'boat'. In 2016, the International Astronomical Union organized a Working Group on Star Names (WGSN) to catalog and standardize proper names for stars. The WGSN's first bulletin of July 2016 included a table of the first two batches of names approved by the WGSN; which included Zaurak for this star.

USS Zaurak (AK-117) was a United States Navy Crater class cargo ship named after the star.

References

M-type giants
Asymptotic-giant-branch stars
Slow irregular variables
Eridanus (constellation)
Eridani, Gamma
Durchmusterung objects
Eridani, 34
025025
018543
1231
Zaurak